Curr is an English surname.

People
Edward Curr (1798–1850), Australian settler and politician
Edward Micklethwaite Curr (1820–1889), his eldest child, Australian pastoralist and squatter
John Curr (c. 1756–1823), English manager of collieries and innovator
Joseph Curr (1793–1847), Roman Catholic priest and author

Places
Curr, a townland in County Londonderry, Northern Ireland
Curr, a townland in County Tyrone, Northern Ireland
Skye of Curr